The 2020–21 A.C. Milan season was the 122nd season in the club's history and their 87th (109th overall) in the top-flight of Italian football. Milan competed in Serie A, the Coppa Italia, and the UEFA Europa League.

Season overview
On 22 July 2020, manager Stefano Pioli extended his expiring contract with Milan for two additional seasons. This came after multiple reports linked Ralf Rangnick to the club. The
previous day, Milan had secured a play-off spot in the UEFA Europa League for the 2020–21 season thanks to an away win against Sassuolo.

On 1 October, Milan qualified for the group stage of the Europa League after defeating Primeira Liga side Rio Ave in a marathon 24-kick penalty shoot-out. The win also continued an unbeaten run for Milan in all competitions that stretched back to 8 March 2020.

On 5 November 2020, the club fell to its first defeat in 24 matches with a 0–3 loss at home to Lille in the Europa League. It was Milan's longest unbeaten streak in 24 years.

On 20 December 2020, Rafael Leao scored after 6.76 seconds in a championship match against Sassuolo. This was the fastest goal ever in Serie A and in the top 5 UEFA leagues.

On 23 December 2020, in a championship match against Lazio, Milan became the first team in over 70 years to score at least 2 goals in 15 consecutive league games, the record being 18 consecutive games.

After the winter transfers window, Milan remained without South American players active into main rosters, after the sales of Léo Duarte and Mateo Musacchio. It was the first time since 24 years (1997).

On the final day they secured qualification for the UEFA Champions League for the first time since the 2013-14 season

Players

Squad information

.

Transfers

Summer window
Deals officialised beforehand will be effective starting from 1 September 2020.

In

Loan in

Loan returns

Total spending:  €23.68M

Out

Loans ended

Loans out

Total income:  €47M

Winter window

In

Loans in

Loan returns

Total spending:  €0.5M

Out

Loans out

Total income: €1M

Pre-season and friendlies

Competitions

Overview

Serie A

League table

Results summary

Results by round

Matches
The league fixtures were announced on 2 September 2020.

Coppa Italia

UEFA Europa League

Qualifying rounds and play-off round

Group stage

The group stage draw was held on 2 October 2020.

Knockout phase

Round of 32
The draw for the round of 32 was held on 14 December 2020.

Round of 16
The draw for the round of 16 was held on 26 February 2021.

Statistics

Appearances and goals

|-
! colspan=14 style=background:#dcdcdc; text-align:center| Goalkeepers

|-
! colspan=14 style=background:#dcdcdc; text-align:center| Defenders

|-
! colspan=14 style=background:#dcdcdc; text-align:center| Midfielders

|-
! colspan=14 style=background:#dcdcdc; text-align:center| Forwards

|-
! colspan=14 style=background:#dcdcdc; text-align:center| Players transferred out during the season

Goalscorers

 Players in italics left the team during the season

Assists

Clean sheets

Disciplinary record

 Updated as per 23 May 2021

Goal of the season
Winner: Ante Rebić (vs. Juventus)

Runner-up: Brahim Díaz (vs. Juventus)

Third/ fourth place: Rafael Leão (vs. Benevento) and Fikayo Tomori (vs. Juventus)

References

A.C. Milan seasons
Milan
2020–21 UEFA Europa League participants seasons